Muhammed Wattad (1 June 1937 – 24 September 1994) was an Israeli Arab journalist, writer and politician who served as a member of the Knesset between 1981 and 1988.

Biography
Born in Jatt during the Mandate era, Wattad was a member of the Israeli Communist Youth and Hashomer Hatzair. He attended Tel Aviv University, where he took Asian and African Studies.

A member of Mapam, he edited the Arabic-language version of the party's newspaper, Al HaMishmar. In 1981 he was elected to the Knesset on the Alignment list (an alliance of Mapam and the Labor Party). He was re-elected in 1984, shortly after which Mapam left the Alignment. On 12 July 1988 he left Mapam to join Hadash, due to disappointment with Mapam's policy towards the First Intifada.

He lost his seat in the 1988 elections. After leaving politics, he managed and edited the Kul al-Arab newspaper, and later ran a public relations firm.

He died in 1994 following a traffic collision.

References

External links

1937 births
1994 deaths
People from Haifa District
Arab people in Mandatory Palestine
Tel Aviv University alumni
Arab members of the Knesset
Israeli journalists
20th-century Israeli businesspeople
Road incident deaths in Israel
Hashomer Hatzair members
Hadash politicians
Alignment (Israel) politicians
Mapam politicians
Members of the 10th Knesset (1981–1984)
Members of the 11th Knesset (1984–1988)
Israeli Arab journalists
20th-century journalists